Parade is Minori Chihara's third solo album. The album contains all three CD singles released in the same year: Melty tale storage, Ameagari no Hana yo Sake, and a modified version of Paradise Lost. Its release promotion featured a "Dream Limited Edition" including an alternate album cover and a photo picturebook. Bonus items such as B2 posters and polaroid prints were also included upon purchase of the album at specific chain stores included in the promotion. Parade placed 16th on the Oricon charts after its debut.

Track listing

"Voyager train"
"Prism in the name of hope"
"Fairy Tune"
"Lush march!!"

"Melty tale storage"

"Paradise Lost -at next nest-"
"FUTURE STAR"

"everlasting..."

References

2008 albums
Lantis (company) albums
Minori Chihara albums